Imedashvili is a Georgian surname. Notable people with the surname include:

Davit Imedashvili (born 1984), Georgian football player
Lasha Imedashvili (born 1996), Russian football player

Georgian-language surnames